The 1902 Stetson Hatters football team represented the private Stetson College in the sport of American football during the 1902 college football season.

Schedule

References

Stetson
Stetson Hatters football seasons
Stetson Hatters football